Anna Maria Braun (born 3 July 1979) is a German business executive and lawyer. Since 2019, she has been managing the family business B. Braun in the 6th generation as CEO. She also holds 10% of the company's shares.

Early life and education
Braun was born in Melsungen, the daughter of Ludwig Georg Braun. She graduated from high school in England. She studied law at Georgetown University in Washington, D.C. with a Master of Laws degree.

Career
In 2009, Braun joined the family business. Before her position as CEO, she headed the subsidiary B. Braun Medical Industries in Malaysia in 2013. By 2016, she was on the board of B. Braun Melsungen AG responsible for the Asia-Pacific operations where she also serves as president.

Other activities
 Robert Koch Foundation, Member of the Board of Trustees

Personal life
Braun is married and has three children.

References

1979 births
Living people
People from Schwalm-Eder-Kreis
German chief executives
Women corporate executives
German billionaires
Georgetown University Law Center alumni
20th-century German businesspeople
21st-century German businesspeople
21st-century German women